Diabetes and deafness (DAD) or maternally inherited diabetes and deafness (MIDD) or mitochondrial diabetes is a subtype of diabetes which is caused from a point mutation at position 3243 in human mitochondrial DNA, which consists of a circular genome. This affects the gene encoding tRNALeu.  Because mitochondrial DNA is contributed to the embryo by the oocyte and not by spermatozoa, this disease is inherited from maternal family members only. As indicated by the name, MIDD is characterized by diabetes and sensorineural hearing loss.

Signs and symptoms
As suggested by the name, patients with MIDD are subject to sensorineural hearing loss. This begins with a reduction in the perception of frequencies above approximately 5 kHz which progressively declines, over the years, to severe hearing loss at all frequencies. The diabetes that accompanies the hearing loss can be similar to Type 1 diabetes or Type 2 diabetes; however, Type 1-like diabetes is the more common form of the two. MIDD has also been associated with a number of other issues including kidney dysfunction, gastrointestinal problems, and cardiomyopathy.

Genetics

Penetrance and age of onset

MIDD represents 1% of people who have diabetes. Over 85% of people that carry the mutation in mitochondrial DNA at position 3243 present symptoms of diabetes. The average age at which people who have MIDD are typically diagnosed is 37 years old but has been seen to range anywhere between 11 years to 68 years old. Of these people with diabetes carrying the mitochondrial DNA mutation at position 3243, 75% experience sensorineural hearing loss. In these cases, hearing loss normally appears before the onset of diabetes and is marked by a decrease in perception of high tone frequencies. The associated hearing loss with diabetes is typically more common and more quickly declining in men than in women.

Effect of mutation on tRNALeu(UUR)

Mitochondria have their own circular genome which contains 37 genes, of which 22 code for tRNAs. These tRNAs play an essential role in protein synthesis by transporting amino acids to the ribosome.  MIDD is caused by an A to G substitution in the mitochondrial DNA at position 3243, which encodes tRNALeu(UUR). This mutation is typically in heteroplasmic form. A mutation in this gene (A3243G) causes the native conformation to be destabilized, as well as dimerization in the tRNALeu(UUR). The uridine at the anticodon first position of the tRNALeu(UUR) is normally post- transcriptionally modified to ensure correct codon recognition. Such modification is known as taurine modification, which is decreased as a result of the improper structure of the tRNALeu(UUR). Incorrect tRNALeu(UUR) structure also results in decreased aminoacylation. The mutation has also been shown to result in decreased function of the tRNA and thus protein synthesis.

Metabolic characteristics of diabetes in MIDD

The A3243G mutation in mitochondrial DNA can be present in any tissue, however, it is more commonly present in tissues with lower replication rates such as muscle. The presence of this mutation can lead to decreased oxygen consumption as a result of reduced function of the respiratory chain and a decrease in oxidative phosphorylation. In some people, this reduction in function of the respiratory chain is suggested to be caused by unbalanced amounts of proteins that are encoded by mitochondrial DNA, due to the presence of the A3243G mutation. However, in other people, the same amount of mitochondrial proteins are generated, but their stability is compromised due to the improper incorporation of amino acids at the UUR codons of the mitochondrial mRNAs. This is a result of the mutated tRNALeu(UUR) with its decreased function in protein synthesis.
A decrease in function of the respiratory chain as a result of a mitochondrial DNA mutation could result in a decrease of ATP production. This decrease in ATP could have detrimental effects on other processes in the body. One such process is insulin secretion by pancreatic Beta-cells. In pancreatic Beta-cells, precise levels of ATP/ADP regulate the opening and closing of the KATP channel, which controls the secretion of insulin. When mutations in the mitochondria disrupt the ATP/ADP ratio, this channel cannot function properly and this can result in a person being deficient in insulin. Since the age of onset is later in a person's life, it has been suggested that age plays a role in contributing, along with the reduced ATP/ADP ratio, to the slow deterioration of the function of B-cells.

Metabolic characteristics of deafness in MIDD

Hearing loss, as caused by the 3243 mitochondrial DNA mutation, is seen in the form of progressive cochlear dysfunction. Although the mechanism by which the mutation in the tRNALeu(UUR) causes this dysfunction of the cochlea is still under investigation, it has been hypothesized that it involves the ion pumps required for sound transduction. As the mutation in the tRNALeu(UUR) leads to unbalanced amounts or unstable respiratory chain enzymes, respiration and oxidative phosphorylation are reduced, leading to lower levels of ATP.  Naturally, the most metabolically active organs in a person will be affected by this ATP deficiency. Included in these metabolically active organs is the cochlear stria vascularis. The stria vascularis and the hair cells, both essential to sound transduction, make use of ion pumps to regulate the concentration of ions including K+, Na+, and Ca2+ using ATP. Without sufficient levels of ATP, these concentration gradients are not maintained and this can lead to cell death in both the stria vascularis and the hair cells, causing hearing loss.

In the eye, MIDD is characterized by progressive atrophy of the retinal pigment epithelium. Initially, the fovea is spared. Thus, patients often have good visual acuity. However, over time the areas of atrophy expand with eventual loss of central vision.

Table 1: Metabolically active organs that can be affected by the 3243A>G mitochondrial point mutation and the associated complication:

Diagnosis

Treatment

Initial 
Initially, the person is treated by dietary changes and hypoglycaemic agents. This does not last long before the person has to be started on insulin (within 2 years of diagnosis).

See also
 Deafness
 Diabetes

References

External links 

Diabetes
Deafness
Mitochondrial diseases